Loraine is a city in Renville County, North Dakota, United States. The population was 9 at the 2020 census. It is part of the Minot Micropolitan Statistical Area.

Loraine was founded in 1907 and is said to have been named by Mohall banker Sherwood H. Sleeper (namesake of Sherwood) for Fort La Reine, one of the forts of the exploration directed by Pierre Gaultier de Varennes, sieur de La Vérendrye in the 18th century.

Geography
Loraine is located at  (48.867126, -101.569387).

Demographics

2010 census
As of the census of 2010, there were 9 people, 4 households, and 2 families residing in the city. The racial makeup of the city was 100.0% White.

There were 4 households, of which 25.0% had children under the age of 18 living with them, 50.0% were married couples living together, and 50.0% were non-families. 50.0% of all households were made up of individuals. The average household size was 2.25 and the average family size was 3.50.

The median age in the city was 49.3 years. 22.2% of residents were under the age of 18; 11.1% were between the ages of 18 and 24; 11.1% were from 25 to 44; 55.5% were from 45 to 64; and 0.0% were 65 years of age or older. The gender makeup of the city was 66.7% male and 33.3% female.

2000 census
As of the census of 2000, there were 19 people, 8 households, and 5 families residing in the city. The population density was 78.7 people per square mile (30.6/km2). There were 8 housing units at an average density of 33.1 per square mile (12.9/km2). The racial makeup of the city was 100.00% White.

There were 8 households, out of which 37.5% had children under the age of 18 living with them, 62.5% were married couples living together, and 37.5% were non-families. 37.5% of all households were made up of individuals, and 25.0% had someone living alone who was 65 years of age or older. The average household size was 2.38 and the average family size was 3.20.

In the city, the population was spread out, with 31.6% under the age of 18, 21.1% from 25 to 44, 26.3% from 45 to 64, and 21.1% who were 65 years of age or older. The median age was 44 years. For every 100 females, there were 111.1 males. For every 100 females age 18 and over, there were 116.7 males.

The median income for a household in the city was $36,250, and the median income for a family was $36,250. Males had a median income of $0 versus $16,250 for females. The per capita income for the city was $7,810. There are 25.0% of families living below the poverty line and 13.3% of the population, including no under eighteens and none of those over 64.

Businesses
There is one restaurant in Loraine, on Main Street, called 'The Naked Moose'.

References

Cities in North Dakota
Cities in Renville County, North Dakota
Populated places established in 1907
1907 establishments in North Dakota
Minot, North Dakota micropolitan area